Lyudmila Dymchenko  (born 3 March 1977) is a Russian freestyle skier. She was born in Moscow. She competed at the 1994, 1998, 2002 and 2006 Winter Olympics.

References

External links 
 

1977 births
Skiers from Moscow
Living people
Russian female freestyle skiers
Olympic freestyle skiers of Russia
Freestyle skiers at the 1994 Winter Olympics
Freestyle skiers at the 1998 Winter Olympics
Freestyle skiers at the 2002 Winter Olympics
Freestyle skiers at the 2006 Winter Olympics